Thistlethwaite may refer to:

People
Anthony Thistlethwaite (born 1955), British multi-instrumentalist best known as a member of the folk-rock group The Waterboys
Frank Thistlethwaite (1915–2003), English academic
Glenn Thistlethwaite, college football head coach
Matt Thistlethwaite (born 1972), Australian politician
Morwen Thistlethwaite, knot theorist and professor of mathematics for the University of Tennessee in Knoxville
Susan Brooks Thistlethwaite, American theologian

Other uses
Dowker–Thistlethwaite notation, mathematical knot theory